In the 1970s and 1980s, a large number of people – most of whom had haemophilia – were infected with hepatitis C and HIV, the virus that leads to acquired immune deficiency syndrome (AIDS), as a result of receiving contaminated clotting factor products. In the United Kingdom, these were supplied by the National Health Service (NHS) with many of the products being imported from the USA.

The Infected Blood Inquiry statistics report, published in September 2022, set out to establish the true numbers of those infected and includes David Spiegelhalter among its authors. The report found that around 1,250 people with bleeding disorders were infected with HIV in the UK and that at least a further 2,400 people were infected with Hepatitis C. The report concluded that around three-quarters of those infected with HIV have died and that at least 700 people infected with Hepatitis C had died. The report also found that 8,120 people were chronically infected with Hepatitis C ten years or more after contaminated blood transfusions. Circumstances under which people were infected via transfusions are different to factor products. For example, blood for blood transfusion was not imported from the USA.

People with haemophilia were principally infected via the plasma-derived product known as factor VIII, a processed pharmaceutical product sourced from the United States and elsewhere. The creation of such products involved dangerous manufacturing processes. Large groups of paid donors were used (as many as 60,000 per batch, and including prisoners and drug addicts); it only required one infected donor to contaminate an entire batch, which would then infect all of the patients that received that material. In contrast, this was at a time when the practice of paying donors for whole blood in the United States had effectively ceased; the UK did not import whole blood from abroad, but it did import large quantities of Factor VIII given to those infected (as described in the documentary Factor 8: The Arkansas Prison Blood Scandal). The principal reason that the UK imported these products was that it did not produce enough of its own, and efforts to achieve self-sufficiency were inadequately funded.

A study published in 1986 showed that 76% of those who used commercial clotting-factor products became infected with HIV, as opposed to none of those who only used the previous treatment cryoprecipitate.

No government, healthcare or pharmaceutical entity in the UK has admitted any liability in the scandal. As part of an ongoing public inquiry, 3,000 surviving victims were awarded interim compensation payments in August 2022, to be paid urgently due to the extremely high death rate of survivors.

Background 
Haemophilia is a mostly inherited genetic disorder that impairs the body's ability to clot, a process needed to stop bleeding. This results in people bleeding longer after an injury, easy bruising, and an increased risk of bleeding inside joints or other parts of the body.

There is no long-term cure for haemophilia. Treatment and prevention of bleeding episodes is done primarily by replacing the missing blood clotting factors using "synthetic" or "non-human derived" factor products such as recombinant factor VIII. Factor products work by replacing the missing factor proteins, which can take place at home or in hospital. The clotting factors are made either from plasma or by recombinant methods. In the 1970s, haemophiliacs began to be treated with "Factor Concentrates", which were sold as a revolutionary treatment. The consequential increase in use led to pharmaceutical companies seeking substantial supplies of plasma, and thousands of donors including prisoners, drug addicts, prostitutes and people known to be infected with HIV or hepatitis were allowed or even paid to give their plasma.

Some of the most famous examples of risky plasma harvesting are those of Luckner Cambronne, who became known as "The Vampire of the Caribbean", and also Crysosan Ltd, a company based in Canada that was found guilty of harvesting plasma from the bodies of dead Russians and re-labelling it as originating from Swedish donors.

Products 
Plasma donations could be collected using a process called plasmapheresis. In addition to NHS derived factors produced by Bio Products Laboratory (BPL), manufacturers that supplied clotting factor products to the UK during the mid-1970s and 1980s included Abbott (Profilate), Armour Pharmaceuticals (Factorate), Bayer-owned Cutter (Koate), Baxter International-owned Travenol/Hyland (Hemofil/Interhem), Immuno (Kryobulin) and Speywood (Humanate).
 BPL: In 2013 the British government sold an 80% stake in the company to Bain Capital for approximately £230 million. In 2016 BPL was acquired by the Creat Group for £820m; the government stood to receive £164m from its remaining 20% share in BPL.
 Armour (Revlon): In 1978 Armour was purchased by Revlon for $90m which owned the company until 1987 when it was sold to Rhône-Poulenc which purchased Revlon's drug operation for $690m in cash. In 1996 Armour and Behringwerke were merged and became Centeon. In 1999 Centeon changed its name to Aventis Behring after the parent companies, Rorer and Hoechst AG merged to become Aventis. In 2004, CSL completed its acquisition of Aventis Behring for $925m, today known as CSL Behring.
 Bayer: Cutter Labs, which produced factor VIII, was originally owned by Miles Laboratories. In 1974 Cutter Labs was purchased by Bayer, and in 1978 Bayer also purchased Miles Labs. In 1995 Bayer dropped the Miles Labs brand name. In 2005 a new company, Talecris (set up by Cerberus Capital Management and Ampersand) acquired Bayer's plasma business and assets for $590m. Bayer however, did not include its recombinant factor VIII "Kogenate" in the sale and remains active in distribution internationally. In 2009, CSL Limited attempted to take over Talecris for $3.1 billion but was stopped by the Federal Trade Commission which charged the deal would be illegal. In 2011, a year after announcing the $4bn deal, Grifols completed a takeover of Talecris.
 Hyland/Travenol (Baxter): Baxter created Travenol Labs in 1949 and acquired Hyland Labs in 1952. In 1993 Baxter, was implicated in a lawsuit brought by haemophiliacs infected with HIV in the United States, and, by the end of that year, president James Tobin had quit. In 1996 Baxter settled a lawsuit brought by haemophiliacs in Japan. In 2015, Baxter split-off its haemophilia sector to create Baxalta. In 2016 Baxalta was acquired by Shire plc for $32bn.
 Immuno AG: Baxter purchased Immuno AG in 1996 in an effort to keep up with competitors for some $715m.

1973–1986 – Hepatitis 
The dangers of factor concentrates had been raised since their inception. In 1974, American scientist Judith Graham Pool (who previously discovered the frozen blood product cryoprecipitate, a safer treatment) described the products as "dangerous" and "unethical" and warned against their use. The World Health Organization also warned the UK not to import blood from countries with a high prevalence of hepatitis, such as the United States.

In May 1975, the World Health Organization passed a widely circulated resolution urging all countries to aim at self-sufficiency in blood products.

In September 1975, an article was published detailing occurrences of a new kind of hepatitis.

In December 1975, an episode of the World in Action programme highlighted the danger of hepatitis from imported clotting-factor products.

By the end of 1978, more than 50% of the factor VIII used in England was being imported from overseas. This was because the country had failed to become self-sufficient in its own supplies.

The BPL, which manufactured UK blood products, ran into continual trouble from under-funding. The Archer Report said, "In July 1979, the Medicines Inspectorate visited BPL. They reported that the buildings were never designed for the scale of production envisaged. They commented: 'If this were a commercial operation we would have no hesitation in recommending that manufacture should cease until the facility was upgraded to a minimum acceptable level'. BPL was rescued by Crown Immunity. Among their recommendations the Inspectorate advised: 'Under no circumstances should production of any product be increased under the existing manufacturing conditions'. Meanwhile, the existing plant continued production, relying on Crown Immunity to dispense with all the requirements of the Medicines Act, but was able to meet only about 40% of the national requirements."

A study published in December 1983 showed conclusively that the risk to a haemophiliac of contracting hepatitis C by using untreated clotting-factor products was 100% upon first exposure.

1981–1990 – HIV 
In July 1982, the American Centers for Disease Control and Prevention (CDC) reported that at least 3 haemophiliacs there had developed Pneumocystis carinii pneumonia, 2 had died, and all 3 had used untreated clotting-factor products. The CDC said that "the occurrence among the three hemophiliac cases suggests the possible transmission of an agent through blood products".

In March 1983, the CDC reported that "Blood products or blood appear responsible for AIDS among hemophilia patients".

In May 1983, Dr N. S. Galbraith, director of the Communicable Disease Surveillance Centre in England and Wales, sent a paper entitled "Action on AIDS" to Dr Ian Field at the Department of Health and Social Security in London informing him of the death from AIDS of a haemophiliac who had received factor VIII concentrate imported from the United States. Galbraith stated: "I have reviewed the literature and come to the conclusion that all blood products made from blood donated in the USA after 1978 should be withdrawn from use until the risk of AIDS transmission by these products has been clarified ... I am most surprised that the USA manufacturers of the implicated blood products have not informed their customers of this new hazard. I assume no critical warning has been received in the United Kingdom?" Despite Galbraith's warning, the products were not withdrawn; a Department of Health letter considered that his suggestion was "premature".

In September 1983, a leaflet distributed to UK blood donors answered the question as to whether AIDS could be transmitted by blood-products to be "Almost certainly yes".

In November 1983, the UK Health Minister, Kenneth Clarke, told Parliament that "There is no conclusive evidence that AIDS is transmitted by blood products", and the importation of infected products continued. When giving evidence to the Penrose Inquiry, Dr. Mark Winter said that, at the time Ken Clarke made this statement, "all haemophilia clinicians by this stage clearly believed that commercial blood products could and were transmitting AIDS".

In January 1984, Lord Glenarthur (Parliamentary Under Secretary of State at the DHSS) said that "It remains the case that there is no conclusive evidence of the transmission of AIDS through blood products, although the circumstantial evidence is strong", and, again, the use of untreated clotting-factor products and importation continued.

In April 1989, the HIV Haemophilia Litigation commenced which culminated in December 1990 with an out-of-court settlement.

2000 – Destroyed-evidence investigation 
In April 2000, the Department of Health published an internal audit to examine the loss of records relating to hepatitis C litigation. The report concluded that "an arbitrary and unjustified decision, most likely taken by an inexperienced member of staff, was responsible for the destruction of a series of files containing the minutes and background papers of the Advisory Committee on the Virological Safety of Blood (ACVSB)".

2009 – The Archer Report 
In the early 2000s the former Solicitor General for England and Wales, Lord Peter Archer, campaigned for an inquiry into the tainted blood scandal alongside Lord Owen, who was the Health Minister from 1974 to 1976, Lord Jenkin, Health Secretary from 1979 to 1981, and others. They were unsuccessful.

In a 1990 episode of The Cook Report, Owen said: "I can see why some people would be unhappy with having all the facts revealed because it will show negligence". In September 2016 Owen gave a speech in London during which he said the scandal had been covered up.

The late Lord Archer of Sandwell chaired a privately funded independent investigation set up in 2007. The Archer Report was published in 2009 and aimed to uncover the causes of the events that led to the thousands of infections and deaths. The report held no legal or official status and was unable to subpoena witnesses or demand the disclosure of documents. Nonetheless, it sought to address the issue of missing evidence and documents relating to the scandal. For example, the ministerial papers of Lord Owen had been destroyed. "We have been unable to ascertain who carried out the destruction of the papers, and who gave the instructions. But the conclusion appears inescapable that some official made a decision which he or she had no authority to make, or that someone was guilty of a serious error of judgement. The consequence is that Lord Owen has done his best to recollect details of events a quarter of a century ago, but both he, and we, have been deprived of the primary sources", Lord Peter Archer reported. Lord Jenkin also voiced his difficulties obtaining documents for the inquiry, although the report stated: "He subsequently received from the Department two bundles of documents. One of these was to be treated as confidential". Lord Jenkin felt that the destruction of records was deliberate, and done "in order to draw a line under the disaster".

Another handling error is described in the inquiry: "mishandling of documents arose in connection with a number of files relating to the Advisory Committee on the Virological Safety of Blood between May 1989 and February 1992 which were found to be missing". The report went on to state: "They were in fact destroyed over a period from July 1994 to March 1998". When summarising these events it is stated "some of those who gave evidence to us suspected that there was an exercise in suppressing evidence of negligence or misconduct."

2015 – Scottish Penrose Inquiry 

In 2008 the Scottish government announced a public inquiry into the scandal covering Scotland only, to be chaired by Lord Penrose. The inquiry's terms of reference outlined five deaths that were to be examined, but only one of those victims was a haemophiliac and that person had been infected with hepatitis C in the 1960s as part of their treatment for haemophilia.

Published in 2015, the inquiry was described as a whitewash and waste of public money (over £12 million) by critics after it found that very little could have been done differently, and failed to apportion any blame in the scandal whilst making just one recommendation. Its recommendation was to offer blood tests to anyone in Scotland who had a blood transfusion before 1991 and who had not already been tested for hepatitis C.

2017 – Legal action and UK public inquiry 
In July 2017 a group legal action Jason Evans & Ors was brought against the government on behalf of more than 500 people. After years of increasing pressure from campaigners and MPs, Prime Minister Theresa May announced a full UK-wide public inquiry into the scandal. In September 2017 a court ruling found in favour of the victims allowing them to launch a High Court action to seek damages.

2018 – False ministerial statements withdrawn 
In June 2018 the Department of Health issued an apology, because for two years Ministers had told Parliament that in relation to Contaminated Blood Scandal evidence: "All documents up to 1995 are available through the National Archives".

2019 – Files still missing 
In February 2019, it emerged that around 450 files had been taken from the archives by staff from the Department of Health and Social Care, and not returned, sparking concerns among campaigners that the department was attempting a cover-up.

Government support 
Successive governments, both Labour and Conservative, have been criticised for their handling of the case, limited support schemes and refusal to conduct a public inquiry (until 2017). Some limited support has been provided to selected individuals through charitable trusts which is often subject to means testing, though no damages or compensation have ever been paid to UK victims or their families.

In 1991 the Conservative government made £42 million available to those affected by HIV, this equates to around £29,000 on average between the 1,437 people who received a payment.

In 2017 the Conservatives announced more funds for those with first-stage chronic hepatitis C, but this additional money was reportedly to be sourced from funds for other tainted blood victims. The Department of Health was accused of robbing one set of victims to pay another. Officials stated that it had made available an extra £125 million, more than any previous government, but critics said this money was simply accounted for as a cost to the NHS of extending treatments to those with hepatitis C sooner.

See also 
 Factor 8: The Arkansas Prison Blood Scandal
 HIV trial in Libya after over 400 children were infected with HIV at El-Fatih Children's Hospital in Benghazi, Libya
 M.C. and Others v Italy (right to property case involving bad blood victims)
 R (March) v Secretary of State for Health, a 2010 judicial review involving a claimant treated with contaminated blood products

References 

United Kingdom
Health disasters in the United Kingdom
HIV/AIDS in the United Kingdom
Medical scandals in the United Kingdom
Scandals in the United Kingdom
Political scandals in the United Kingdom